Werner Zimmer (27 November 1929 – 29 April 2019) was a German wrestler. He competed in the men's Greco-Roman flyweight at the 1952 Summer Olympics, representing Saar.

References

External links
 

1929 births
2019 deaths
German male sport wrestlers
Olympic wrestlers of Saar
Wrestlers at the 1952 Summer Olympics
Sportspeople from Saarland